Grant Circle is a traffic circle in the Petworth neighborhood of Northwest Washington, D.C. New Hampshire and Illinois Avenues NW, Varnum Street NW, and 5th Street NW all intersect at this circle. The park within the circle and the adjoining triangles is owned and administered by the National Park Service through its Rock Creek Park unit. The circle and the buildings flanking it were listed on the National Register of Historic Places in 2015.

History
Originally named Sheridan Circle, it was renamed Grant Circle in 1889. Grant Circle is named for Ulysses S. Grant, the former Union Army General who won the American Civil War and later was twice elected President of the United States. The local newsletter the Grant Circular is named after the circle. As of 1895, Grant Circle was unpaved, the area surrounded it was heavy wooded, and the only trace of commerce was an abandoned peanut stand nearby.

In 1906, while excavating a sand pit at Grant Circle and Illinois Avenue, sand banks caved in around several workers. James Major, an African-American worker, was buried in sand. The force of the sand broke Major's neck, killing him instantly. Other workers were buried up their necks and narrowly escaped death.

The blocks surrounding the circle were fully developed by 1920, and the  roadway around it paved in 1921.

The  park within the circle is owned and administered by the National Park Service through its Rock Creek Park unit.

Petworth Methodist Episcopal Church bought land at the southern intersection of Grant Circle and New Hampshire Avenue to build a new church. Petworth Methodist Episcopal Church had been at 8th and Shepherd Streets until its land was acquired by the District's commissioners to build a school, today called Petworth Elementary School. Designed by M.F. Moore, the church was patterned after the style of the period of John Wesley, founder of Methodism. The church was completed in 1916.

Petworth Catholic Church was built on the northwestern side of Grant Circle, between Varnum and Webster streets, in 1920.

Grant Circle was one of the first locales in the city where the double-globe "Bacon lamppost" was erected. The Beaux-Arts-style street light was approved by the United States Commission of Fine Arts in 1924, and is still used only in the city's historic core.

Park features
Once considered as a site to relocate a fountain from the U.S. Botanic Garden and Bartholdi Fountain grounds, the park contains no statues or memorials. When the circle was built, it was in a very rural area, far from the center city, and erecting a statue of Ulysses S. Grant would have been considered an insult.

Landscaped with a variety of trees and shrubs, the park provides walkways, park benches, and opens space for dog walking. The triangle to the north contains a small fenced-in playground.

August 2021 Washington Post Weekend Feature Article
Grant Circle was featured prominently in The Washington Post’s Weekend section on August 27, 2021 in the cover story, "A Driving Force: Traffic circles bring life to the city in unexpected ways." The article began on page 11 of that section, with a photograph of bicyclists in the circle appearing above a header that read, "Circles become city’s town squares."

A second photograph from Grant Circle was printed with that article, and the caption under this photograph appears to be inaccurate. The photograph is of the plaque within the circle that memorializes General Grant, and the caption under it reads: "In 1939, locals successfully pushed back against pressure to install a memorial to Ulysses S. Grant in the circle that bears his name". This sentence is repeated within the text of the article.

Curiously, the most comprehensive source of information on the circle and its design, the 2017 National Park Service Cultural Landscape Inventory, mentions no action of this type in 1939. That report chronicles a number of significant steps related to the installation of features in and the landscaping of the circle between 1924 and 1934. But, after 1934, there are no specific actions identified, only this entry covering 1934 to 1980: "NPS maintains Grant Circle, no major new designs or plantings introduced at the site".

The Post’s 2021 caption may be in reference to a statement from a feature article on the Petworth neighborhood it published on page 15 of the October 5, 1939 edition: "Our Town: Petworth Really a Community Conscious Area". That article includes this statement:

"No Washington section [neighborhood] has more community consciousness, nor works harder to keep it. Petworth is distinctively Petworth. Other sections might work to get a big piece of statuary for the circles in their neighborhood, for instance; but Petworth has worked to keep statuary out of Grant Circle--preferring cedar of Lebanon".

Therefore, what The Post’s 2021 caption suggests was a specific action in 1939 may well be more accurately viewed as a summation of the design-related issues that were addressed between 1924 and 1934, as described in the NPS Cultural Inventory.

It is difficult from the available sources to determine the source of the neighborhood’s opposition to the Grant statuary. It is well documented that there was widespread resistance to memorializing Grant during that period. The Wikipedia page that discusses him notes: "During the late 19th and early 20th centuries, Grant's reputation was damaged by the Lost Cause movement and the Dunning School".

A more detailed discussion of this topic is provided in the June 2010 article from The Atlantic, "How Did Ulysses Grant Become a Charicature?,” by Ta-Nehisi Coates, which discusses how efforts to undermine Grant’s place in history were a direct reflection of the perpetuation of the "Lost Cause" myth and the glorification of secessionist leaders.

Whether any of these themes influenced the design of Grant Circle will have to remain an open question, given the lack of definitive information in the available sources. It is clear, however, that the rigid segregation that existed in the District in that era was a factor in discussions of public use of the circle.

Of particular note is a front page article from the April 6, 1922 edition of The Evening Star, "Children to lose another play site by improvements: Grant Circle will be sodded and made into park space". This article included a discussion of the need for additional play space in the Petworth area, with the overall need outlined as follows: “...the experts of the children's bureau, who have studied the playground situation, here pointed out that at least fifteen acres should be developed for the white children of the section alone, and two additional acres for the colored children". No information is provided as to whether that 15 to 2 ratio was sufficient to meet the "separate but equal" expectation for the provision of public services that was prevalent during that period of history.

See also
List of circles in Washington, D.C.
Ulysses S. Grant

References

Bibliography

External links
Grant Circle Historic District – D.C. Office of Planning

Streets in Washington, D.C.
Squares, plazas, and circles in Washington, D.C.
Historic districts on the National Register of Historic Places in Washington, D.C.
Roads on the National Register of Historic Places in Washington, D.C.
National Historic Landmarks in Washington, D.C.
National Park Service areas in Washington, D.C.
Parks in Washington, D.C.
Urban public parks